The Pan American Women's Cadet Handball Championship is the official competition for Cadet women's national handball teams of Americas.

Summary

Medal table

Participating nations

References
 www.panamhandball.org

Pan-American Team Handball Federation competitions
Recurring sporting events established in 2005
2005 establishments in Brazil
Recurring events disestablished in 2008
2008 disestablishments in Brazil